Alan Hamel's Comedy Bag was a Canadian variety-comedy television series which aired on CBC Television for one programming season from 23 September 1972 to 9 June 1973.

The Montreal-produced half-hour program aired on Saturdays and featured American guest appearances. Alan Hamel, the titular series host, was previously a regular on the 1960s Canadian series Razzle Dazzle and a game show host on American television in 1969.

External links
 
 
 

1972 Canadian television series debuts
1973 Canadian television series endings
CBC Television original programming
1970s Canadian sketch comedy television series
1970s Canadian variety television series